The National Basketball Association  Conference Finals are the Eastern and Western championship series of the National Basketball Association (NBA), a major professional basketball league in North America. The NBA was founded in 1946 as the Basketball Association of America (BAA). The NBA adopted its current name at the start of the 1949–50 season when the BAA merged with the National Basketball League (NBL). The league currently consists of 30 teams, of which 29 are located in the United States and 1 in Canada. Each team plays 82 games in the regular season. After the regular season, eight teams from each of the league's two conferences qualify for the playoffs. At the end of the playoffs, the top two teams play each other in the Conference Finals, to determine the Conference Champions from each side, who then proceed to play in the NBA Finals. Trophies were given to each conference winner starting in 2001. In 2022, they named them the Bob Cousy Trophy for the Eastern Conference and the Oscar Robertson Trophy for the Western Conference. Also that year, the league started naming an NBA Conference Finals Most Valuable Player (MVP) for each conference.

Overview
Initially, the BAA teams were aligned into two divisions, the Eastern Division and the Western Division. The first two seasons used a playoffs format where Eastern and Western Division teams would face each other before the BAA Finals, hence there were no divisional finals. The two divisions format remained until , when the NBA realigned itself into two conferences with two divisions each, which led to the renaming to Conference Finals. 

The finals was a best-of-3 series from 1949 to 1950, a best-of-5 series from 1951 to 1956, and a best-of-7 series since 1957. Currently, the Conference Finals are played in a best-of-7 series like the NBA playoffs and Finals. The two series are played in late May each year after the first and second rounds of the Playoffs and before the Finals. At the conclusion of the Conference Finals, winners are presented with a silver trophy, caps, and T-shirts, and advance to the NBA Finals. The trophies had a slightly different base for each conference to help distinguish one from the other; the silver basketball on the Eastern Conference trophy sits on three pegs, while the Western Conference trophy has the basketball sitting on intercrossing circular rings.

The Los Angeles Lakers have won the most conference titles with 19. They have also made 23 appearances in the Conference Finals, more than any other team. The Boston Celtics have won 10 Conference titles, the second most of any team. Twenty-two of the 30 active franchises have won at least one conference title. The Denver Nuggets, Minnesota Timberwolves, Atlanta Hawks, Sacramento Kings, Memphis Grizzlies and Los Angeles Clippers have each played in at least one Conference Finals (Denver has played in four, Atlanta and Sacramento in two), but they have each failed to win their respective conference title. Two other franchises, the Charlotte Hornets, and New Orleans Pelicans have never appeared in the Conference Finals.

Conference trophies
The NBA first started awarding conference championship trophies in 2001. In 2022, both were redesigned, with the Eastern and Western Conference trophies being renamed after Bob Cousy and Oscar Robertson, respectively, who were instrumental in developing and advancing the players' labor union, the National Basketball Players Association. The two redesigned trophies each feature a silver basketball with its respective conference finals logo on the underside. The silver basketball is quartered into four sections, representing the winning team first qualifying for the playoffs and then advancing through the three playoff rounds. In that same year, the NBA began awarding Conference Finals MVPs to the best performing player of each conference finals: the Larry Bird Eastern Conference Finals Most Valuable Player Award and the Magic Johnson Western Conference Finals Most Valuable Player Award, named for the two players credited for building the league up to greater popularity in the 1980s. The MVP trophies follow a design similar to that of the Bill Russell NBA Finals MVP trophy, only the ball on each trophy will be silver and would be smaller versions of the Conference Championship trophies in how they sit on the base.

Key

Conference

Eastern Conference Finals

Western Conference Finals 
{| class="wikitable sortable"
! Year !! Champion !! Coach !! class="unsortable|Result !! Runner-up !! Coach 
|-
| 1971 || bgcolor=#FFFF99|Milwaukee Bucks† ||  || align=center|4–1 || Los Angeles Lakers || 
|-
| 1972 || bgcolor=#FFFF99|Los Angeles Lakers† ||  || align=center|4–2 || Milwaukee Bucks || 
|-
| 1973 || Los Angeles Lakers ||  || align=center|4–1 || Golden State Warriors || 
|-
| 1974 || Milwaukee Bucks† ||  || align=center|4–0 || Chicago Bulls || 
|-
| 1975 || bgcolor=#FFFF99|Golden State Warriors ||  || align=center|4–3 || Chicago Bulls || 
|-
| 1976 || Phoenix Suns||  || align=center|4–3 || Golden State Warriors† || 
|-
| 1977 || bgcolor=#FFFF99|Portland Trail Blazers ||  || align=center|4–0 || Los Angeles Lakers†  || 
|-
| 1978 || Seattle SuperSonics ||  || align=center|4–2 || Denver Nuggets || 
|-
| 1979 || bgcolor=#FFFF99|Seattle SuperSonics ||  || align=center|4–3 || Phoenix Suns || 
|-
| 1980 || bgcolor=#FFFF99|Los Angeles Lakers ||  || align=center|4–1 || Seattle SuperSonics || 
|-
| 1981 || Houston Rockets||  || align=center|4–1 || Kansas City Kings || 
|-
| 1982 || bgcolor=#FFFF99|Los Angeles Lakers ||  || align=center|4–0 || San Antonio Spurs || 
|-
| 1983 || Los Angeles Lakers ||  || align=center|4–2 || San Antonio Spurs  || 
|-
| 1984 || Los Angeles Lakers ||  || align=center|4–2 || Phoenix Suns || 
|-
| 1985 || bgcolor=#FFFF99|Los Angeles Lakers ||  || align=center|4–1 || Denver Nuggets || 
|-
| 1986 || Houston Rockets ||  || align=center|4–1 || Los Angeles Lakers || 
|-
| 1987 || bgcolor=#FFFF99|Los Angeles Lakers† ||  || align=center|4–0 || Seattle SuperSonics || 
|-
| 1988 || bgcolor=#FFFF99|Los Angeles Lakers† ||  || align=center|4–3 || Dallas Mavericks || 
|-
| 1989 || Los Angeles Lakers ||  || align=center|4–0 || Phoenix Suns || 
|-
| 1990 || Portland Trail Blazers ||  || align=center|4–2 || Phoenix Suns || 
|-
| 1991 || Los Angeles Lakers ||  || align=center|4–2 || Portland Trail Blazers† || 
|-
| 1992 || Portland Trail Blazers ||  || align=center|4–2 || Utah Jazz || 
|-
| 1993 || Phoenix Suns† ||  || align=center|4–3 || Seattle SuperSonics || 
|-
| 1994 || bgcolor=#FFFF99|Houston Rockets ||  || align=center|4–1 || Utah Jazz || 
|-
| 1995 || bgcolor=#FFFF99|Houston Rockets ||  || align=center|4–2 || San Antonio Spurs†  || 
|-
| 1996 || Seattle SuperSonics ||  || align=center|4–3 || Utah Jazz || 
|-
| 1997 || Utah Jazz ||  || align=center|4–2 || Houston Rockets || 
|-
| 1998 || Utah Jazz† ||  || align=center|4–0 || Los Angeles Lakers || 
|-
| 1999 || bgcolor=#FFFF99|San Antonio Spurs† ||  || align=center|4–0 || Portland Trail Blazers || 
|-
| 2000 || bgcolor=#FFFF99|Los Angeles Lakers† ||  || align=center|4–3 || Portland Trail Blazers || 
|-
| 2001 || bgcolor=#FFFF99|Los Angeles Lakers ||  || align=center|4–0 || San Antonio Spurs† || 
|-
| 2002 || bgcolor=#FFFF99|Los Angeles Lakers ||  || align=center|4–3 || Sacramento Kings† || 
|-
| 2003 || bgcolor=#FFFF99|San Antonio Spurs† ||  || align=center|4–2 || Dallas Mavericks† ||  
|-
| 2004 || Los Angeles Lakers ||  || align=center|4–2 || Minnesota Timberwolves || 
|-
| 2005 || bgcolor=#FFFF99|San Antonio Spurs ||  || align=center|4–1 || Phoenix Suns† || 
|-
| 2006 || Dallas Mavericks ||  || align=center|4–2 || Phoenix Suns || 
|-
| 2007 || bgcolor=#FFFF99|San Antonio Spurs ||  || align=center|4–1 || Utah Jazz || 
|-
| 2008 || Los Angeles Lakers ||  || align=center|4–1 || San Antonio Spurs || 
|-
| 2009 || bgcolor=#FFFF99|Los Angeles Lakers ||  || align=center|4–2 || Denver Nuggets || 
|-
| 2010 || bgcolor=#FFFF99|Los Angeles Lakers ||  || align=center|4–2 || Phoenix Suns || 
|-
| 2011 || bgcolor=#FFFF99|Dallas Mavericks ||  || align=center|4–1 || Oklahoma City Thunder || 
|-
| 2012 || Oklahoma City Thunder ||  || align=center|4–2 || San Antonio Spurs† || 
|-
| 2013 || San Antonio Spurs ||  || align=center|4–0 || Memphis Grizzlies || 
|-
| 2014 || bgcolor=#FFFF99|San Antonio Spurs† ||  || align=center|4–2 || Oklahoma City Thunder || 
|-
| 2015 || bgcolor=#FFFF99|Golden State Warriors† ||  || align=center|4–1 || Houston Rockets || 
|-
| 2016 || Golden State Warriors† ||  || align=center| 4–3 || Oklahoma City Thunder || 
|-
| 2017 || bgcolor=#FFFF99|Golden State Warriors† ||  || align=center| 4–0 || San Antonio Spurs || 
|-
| 2018 || bgcolor=#FFFF99|Golden State Warriors || || align=center| 4–3 || Houston Rockets† || 
|-
| 2019 || Golden State Warriors ||  || align=center| 4–0 || Portland Trail Blazers || 
|-
| 2020 || bgcolor=#FFFF99|Los Angeles Lakers ||  || align=center| 4–1 ||Denver Nuggets || 
|-
| 2021 || Phoenix Suns ||  || align=center| 4–2 ||Los Angeles Clippers || 
|-
| 2022 || bgcolor=#FFFF99|Golden State Warriors' ||  || align=center| 4–1 || Dallas Mavericks || 
|}

Results by teamStats updated through May 26, 2022''
Total number of appearances

Most frequent match-ups among active teams

See also
 List of NBA champions
 List of NBA seasons

Notes

References

External links
 NBA History at NBA.com
 NBA & ABA Playoff Index (includes BAA) at Basketball-Reference.com

 
Conference Finals